Odette Terrade (born 21 February 1949) is a former member of the Senate of France, who represented the Val-de-Marne department.  She is a member of the Communist, Republican, and Citizen Group.

References
Page on the Senate website

1949 births
Living people
French Senators of the Fifth Republic
Women members of the Senate (France)
20th-century French women politicians
21st-century French women politicians
Senators of Val-de-Marne